KKYY (101.3 FM, "Y Country 101.3") is a radio station licensed to serve Whiting, Iowa.  The station is owned by Powell Broadcasting Company, Inc.  It airs a classic country format.

The station was first licensed as KBWH June 2, 1980. The station was assigned these call letters KKYY by the Federal Communications Commission on September 7, 2001.

References

Previous logos

External links
KKYY official website

KYY
Country radio stations in the United States
Radio stations established in 1980
1980 establishments in Iowa